Salford West was a parliamentary constituency in the City of Salford in Greater Manchester from 1885 until 1983. It returned one Member of Parliament (MP)  to the House of Commons of the Parliament of the United Kingdom.

History 
The constituency was created for the 1885 general election by the Redistribution of Seats Act 1885, which split the two-member Salford constituency into three divisions: Salford North, Salford South and Salford West. It was abolished for the 1983 general election.

Boundaries 

1885–1918: The Municipal Borough of Salford wards of St Thomas's and Seedley, and part of Regent ward.

1918–1950: The County Borough of Salford wards of Hope, St Paul's, St Thomas's, and Seedley.

1950–1983: The County Borough of Salford wards of Charlestown, Claremont, Docks, Langworthy, St Paul's, St Thomas's, Seedley, and Weaste.

Members of Parliament

Elections

Elections in the 1880s

Elections in the 1890s

Elections in the 1900s

Elections in the 1910s 

General Election 1914–15:

Another General Election was required to take place before the end of 1915. The political parties had been making preparations for an election to take place and by the July 1914, the following candidates had been selected; 
Liberal: William Stephens
Unionist:

Elections in the 1920s

Elections in the 1930s 

General Election 1939–40

Another General Election was required to take place before the end of 1940. The political parties had been making preparations for an election to take place and by the Autumn of 1939, the following candidates had been selected; 
Conservative: James Emery
Labour: Charles Royle
Liberal: Richard Pugh

Elections in the 1940s

Elections in the 1950s

Elections in the 1960s

Elections in the 1970s

References 
Notes

Further reading

External links

Parliamentary constituencies in North West England (historic)
Constituencies of the Parliament of the United Kingdom established in 1885
Constituencies of the Parliament of the United Kingdom disestablished in 1983
Politics of Salford